Zaleszczyce   is a village in the administrative district of Gmina Gryfice, within Gryfice County, West Pomeranian Voivodeship, in north-western Poland.

Before 1637 the area was part of Duchy of Pomerania. In 1939 the population of Stuthof consisted of 22 persons. For the history of the region, see History of Pomerania.

References

Zaleszczyce